Chuqi Luk'anani (Aymara chuqi gold, luk'ana finger, -ni a suffix to indicate ownership, "the one with a gold finger", also spelled Choquelocanani, Chuquilacani) is a mountain in the Andes of southern Peru, about  high. It is situated in the Puno Region, El Collao Province, Santa Rosa District. Chuqi Luk'anani lies southeast of the mountain Panti Usu.

References

Mountains of Puno Region
Mountains of Peru